Broken Jerusalem Island (sometimes referred to as Old Jerusalem Island) is an uninhabited series of islets between Fallen Jerusalem Island and Round Rock in the British Virgin Islands in the Caribbean.

They are located south of Virgin Gorda.

Uninhabited islands of the British Virgin Islands